Conxita Mora Jordana (15 April 1955 – 5 October 2016), was an Andorran politician, first female Mayor of Andorra la Vella between 1999 and 2003. In 2007 she was the director of the Andorran business federation.

Between 2009 and 2011 she was a member of the General Council of Andorra, the legislative chamber with the Reformist Coalition.

References

1955 births
2016 deaths
Andorran women in politics
University of Barcelona alumni
Members of the General Council (Andorra)
Mayors of Andorra la Vella
21st-century women politicians